Little Santa Cruz Island is an island situated  south of downtown Zamboanga City, on the Basilan Strait.

See also 
 List of islands of the Philippines

External links
 Little Santa Cruz Island at OpenStreetMap

Islands of Zamboanga City
Protected landscapes and seascapes of the Philippines